Rise and Shine is the fourteenth studio album by American country music artist Randy Travis, released on October 15, 2002. His second gospel album, it produced the single "Three Wooden Crosses", which in 2003 became his first Number One single on the Hot Country Singles & Tracks (now Hot Country Songs) chart since 1994's "Whisper My Name". The only other single release from this album was "Pray for the Fish", which peaked at #48.

Track listing

Personnel
Larry Beaird – acoustic guitar (track 5)
Eric Darken – percussion (all tracks except 1 and 9)
Dan Dugmore – pedal steel guitar (track 1)
Pat Flynn – acoustic guitar (all tracks except 5)
Paul Franklin – pedal steel guitar (all tracks except 1 and 5)
Steve Gibson – electric guitar (tracks 5,7), mandolin (track 5)
Doyle Grisham – pedal steel guitar (track 5)
Pastor Matthew Hagee – background vocal (tracks 1,3,4)
Sandra Hagee – background vocals (tracks 1,3,4)
Vicki Hampton – background vocals (tracks 1,10,13)
Aubrey Haynie – fiddle (tracks 2,3,6-12)
Wes Hightower – background vocals (tracks 1,3,5-12)
David Hungate – bass guitar (all tracks)
John Barlow Jarvis – piano (all tracks)
John Jorgenson – electric guitar (track 1)
Christina Ketterling – background vocals (tracks 1,3,4)
Paul Leim – drums (all tracks)
Brent Mason – electric guitar (all tracks except 1 and 5)
Gordon Mote – keyboards (tracks 1,3,5,7,8,10,12,13)
Nina Rodriguez – percussion (tracks 2,3)
Lisa Silver – background vocals (tracks 1,10,13)
Randy Travis – lead vocals (all tracks)
Billy Joe Walker Jr.– acoustic guitar (tracks 7-10)
Cindy Walker – background vocals (tracks 1,10,13)

String section on "If You Only Knew"
Carl Gorodetzky, Pamela Sixfin, Lee Larrison, David Davidson, Conni Ellisor – violins
Kris Wilkinson, Gary Vanosdale – violas
Robert Mason – cello

Strings arranged by Bergen White.

Charts

Weekly charts

Year-end charts

References

External links
Randy Travis discusses each track at randytravis.com

2002 albums
Randy Travis albums
Word Records albums
Warner Records albums
Curb Records albums
Albums produced by Kyle Lehning